Khalil Ibrahim Ali Abdulla Al-Hammadi (born 4 May 1993) is an association football player who plays for Al-Wahda.

Career statistic

Club

1Continental competitions include the AFC Champions League.

International goals
Scores and results list the United Arab Emirates' goal tally first.

Title
UAE President's Cup: 2016–17
UAE League Cup: 2017–18

External links

References

Emirati footballers
1993 births
Living people
Al Dhafra FC players
Al Wahda FC players
UAE Pro League players
Association football midfielders
United Arab Emirates international footballers